The Eyre River is a river in the Great Southern region of Western Australia. The river flows in a south-easterly direction and discharges into Cheynes Inlet and on to the Southern Ocean.

The river was named in 1850 by the explorer Francis Thomas Gregory after the explorer John Eyre, who crossed it in 1841 on his expedition from Adelaide to Albany.

References

Rivers of the Great Southern region